An annular solar eclipse occurred on January 26, 1990. A solar eclipse occurs when the Moon passes between Earth and the Sun, thereby totally or partly obscuring the image of the Sun for a viewer on Earth. An annular solar eclipse occurs when the Moon's apparent diameter is smaller than the Sun's, blocking most of the Sun's light and causing the Sun to look like an annulus (ring). An annular eclipse appears as a partial eclipse over a region of the Earth thousands of kilometres wide.

Related eclipses

Eclipses of 1990 
 An annular solar eclipse on January 26.
 A total lunar eclipse on February 9.
 A total solar eclipse on July 22.
 A partial lunar eclipse on August 6.

Solar eclipses of 1990–1992

Saros 121

Metonic series

Notes

References

1990 1 26
1990 in science
1990 1 26
January 1990 events
1990 in Antarctica